Lara Marie Jackson (born October 14, 1986) is a retired American competitive swimmer who specialized in freestyle. She swam for the University of Arizona from 2005 to 2009 where she was a 9-time NCAA champion. She is the former American record-holder in both the 50-yard freestyle, and the long course 50-meter freestyle.

Jackson set the American record in the prelims of the women's 50-meter freestyle at the 2008 U.S. Olympic Trials with a time of 24.50. Her record lasted only hours as Dara Torres broke it later that afternoon in the semi-finals. Jackson ultimately finished 3rd in the 50 free behind Torres and Jessica Hardy. Despite Hardy's withdrawal from the Olympic team prior to the Games, Jackson was not added to the roster.

At the 2009 NCAA Championship meet, Jackson set the NCAA, meet, and American record in the 50-yard freestyle with a time of 21.40. Her record time was broken in 2011 by Ariana Vanderpool-Wallace from Auburn.

Personal bests (long course)

References

External links
 
 
 

1986 births
Living people
American female swimmers
Arizona Wildcats women's swimmers
Pan American Games gold medalists for the United States
Pan American Games medalists in swimming
Swimmers at the 2011 Pan American Games
Medalists at the 2011 Pan American Games
People from El Paso, Texas
Sportspeople from El Paso, Texas